The H. B. Kapadia New High school is the group of schools located in Ahmedabad and Gandhinagar. The H. B. Kapadia is named after the founder of this school Hiralal Bapulal Kapadia. It provides both Gujarati as well as English medium education facilities. It also provides higher secondary school education in commerce as well as science streams. The chhatral branch is affiliated with Central Board of Secondary Education while the others are affiliated with Gujarat Secondary and Higher Secondary Education Board.

History 
The first branch of The H. B. Kapadia New High school was established in 1926 at GheeKanta. Then the shahibaugh Branch was established in 1956 by Hiralal Bapulal Kapadia.

See also 

 Sheth Chimanlal Nagindas Vidyalaya
 Mahatma Gandhi International School, Ahmedabad

References

External links 
 School website

High schools and secondary schools in Gujarat
Schools in Ahmedabad